The Unnamable II: The Statement of Randolph Carter (a.k.a. The Unnamable Returns) is a 1992 horror film directed Jean-Paul Ouellette. It incorporates elements from the short story "The Statement of Randolph Carter" by H.P. Lovecraft, and is a sequel to The Unnamable, which is loosely based on the short story of the same name, also by Lovecraft.

Mark Kinsey Stephenson reprises the role of Randolph Carter from the previous film, while Charles Clausmeyer also reprises his role as Howard. John Rhys-Davies plays Professor Warren, and David Warner plays the dean of the university.

David Warner is also featured in the film Necronomicon, starring alongside Jeffrey Combs, who plays Lovecraft himself.

Plot
The film opens outside the Winthrop house from the first film, only this time it is swarming with cops and medical technicians. Howard is being wheeled into an ambulance because he has three deep gashes in his chest, Tanya is put into a squad car, and Randolph Carter is carrying Joshua Winthrop's book of spells aka The Necronomicon, which he gives to Howard for safe keeping. Randolph confronts the Dean of the university about the house, who tells him not to dabble in things that he could never understand. Then Randolph goes to Professor Warren, who agrees to help.

Howard is dragged along and the three go to the spot where Randolph erupted from the ground in the first film. Howard is to stay near the car to keep guard. Eventually, Warren and Carter find Alyda, Joshua Winthrop's demon daughter (Joshua Winthrop appears to Howard in a dream at some point to confess that he caused his daughter's evilness) wrapped up in the roots of the tree that dragged Alyda out from the house in the first film. Warren injects the monstrous being with insulin to rid her body of the demon. This plan works, and she transforms into a beautiful woman, naked and wrapped in the tree roots. She is given sugar to bring her out of the insulin overdose, and the pair free her from her bonds. The demon is still in the caves, though, and it begins to hunt Alyda down so that they can be one again. After a showdown in the Arkham Library, Randolph manages to defeat the demon, but Alyda dies simultaneously.

Cast
Mark Kinsey Stephenson as Randolph Carter 
Charles Klausmeyer as Howard
John Rhys-Davies as Professor Warren 
Julie Strain as Creature 
David Warner as Chancellor Thayer 
Shawn T. Lim as Robert 
Siobhan McCafferty as Officer Debbie Lesh
Richard Domeier as Officer Malcolm Bainbridge 
Brad Blaisdell as Officer Ben Lesh 
Kevin Alber as Jack

Critical reaction

In their book Lurker in the Lobby: A Guide to the Cinema of H. P. Lovecraft, Andrew Migliore and John Strysik write: "Unfortunately, the sinister grace of Katrin Alexandre's she-demon from the first film is sorely missing. Julie Strain's take on the creature is like herself, bigger and more athletic, and the overall feel is less like Lovecraft and more like a commonplace monster that's escaped from a Brothers Grimm fairy tale. That said, Unnamable II is still a fun ride for anybody who has ever tried smuggling a member of the opposite sex into their dorm room after a long night in a graveyard."

References

External links

1992 films
1992 horror films
British sequel films
British horror films
Films based on works by H. P. Lovecraft
Films based on short fiction
1990s English-language films
1990s British films